"¡Ay, Amor!" (English: Oh Love) is a ballad written and performed by Mexican singer-songwriter Ana Gabriel and produced by Mariano Pérez Bautista. It was released as the first single from her third studio album, Pecado Original (1987). This song became the second to spend 14 consecutive weeks at number one in the Billboard Hot Latin Tracks chart, after fellow Mexican singer Daniela Romo with "De Mí Enamórate", being surpassed in the same year by Yuri when her single "Qué Te Pasa" achieved sixteen weeks at the top of the chart.

"¡Ay, Amor!" is also recognized as one of Gabriel's signature songs and has been performed by several singers, including Tino y su Banda Joven, Jannette Chao, Keyla Caballero, Myriam and Yuri.

Background
Mexican singer-songwriter Ana Gabriel, after ten years of preparation, received in 1984 the opportunity to participate on the Mexican Festival 'Valores Juveniles', in which she participated as a composer with the song "No Me Lástimes Más", and won second place in the contest. Following this victory she was called by CBS and was offered an exclusive contract. The following year, 1985, Gabriel participated in the OTI Festival with the song "Búscame", wrote with Tony Flores, and took the award for 'Revelation of the Year'. That same year she recorded his first album, entitled Un estilo. In 1986 she participated again in the OTI with the song "A Tu Lado" and this time was recognized as 'Singer of the Year'. Finally, in 1987, Gabriel had her third chance at this festival with the song "¡Ay, amor!", which earned the awards for Best Song, Best Singer and Best Composer, and the opportunity to represent Mexico at the Festival OTI International in Lisbon, Portugal, where she ranked third, in a tie with Spain.

"¡Ay, Amor!" was produced by Mariano Pérez Bautista and was released as the first single from Gabriel's third studio album Pecado Original (1987). This song was a success in Mexico and United States, leading the album to its peak at number three in the Billboard Latin Pop Albums and approximate sales of two and a half million units in Latin America.

Chart performance
The song debuted on the Billboard Hot Latin Tracks chart at number 35 on 21 November 1987 and climbed to the top ten four weeks later. It reached the top position of the chart on 23 January 1988, replacing "Soy Así" by Mexican singer José José and being replaced twelve weeks later by Juan Gabriel's "Debo Hacerlo". "¡Ay, amor! returned to number-one for two additional weeks, replacing "Y Ahora Te Vas" by Los Bukis and being replaced by "Qué Te Pasa" by Yuri. Only four female singers have achieved the same number of weeks (or more) at number one on the Hot Latin Tracks history: Daniela Romo (14 weeks with "De Mí Enamórate" in 1986–1987), Yuri (16 weeks with "Qué Te Pasa" in 1988) and Shakira (25 weeks with "La Tortura" in 2005).

Charts

Weekly charts

Year-end charts

All-time charts

Credits and personnel
This information adopted from Allmusic.

Mariano Pérez Bautista – director, producer, mixing
Carlos Gómez – piano, arranger, keyboards, engineer
Javier Losada – piano, arranger, keyboards, engineer
Henry Díaz – percussion
Ana Gabriel – lead vocals, lyrics
Rodrigo García – acoustic guitar
Eduardo Gracía – bass
Antonio Moreno – drums
Tito Saavedra – engineer, mixing
Antonio Sauco – arranger
Maisa Hens – vocals
María Lar – vocals
José Flacón – vocals

References

1987 singles
1987 songs
Ana Gabriel songs
Songs written by Ana Gabriel
Spanish-language songs
CBS Discos singles
1980s ballads
Pop ballads